Amos Harel is an Israeli journalist.

Personal

He graduated from Tel Aviv University and lives in Hod Hasharon.

Journalism career
As of 2014 he is the military and defense analyst for the Israeli newspaper Haaretz.

From 1999 to 2005 Harel anchored a weekly program about defense issues on Army Radio.  Before becoming the military analyst for Haaretz, he spent four years as the night editor of the printed Hebrew edition.

Published works
 The Seventh War: How we won and why we lost the war with the Palestinians.  with Avi Issacharoff. 2004 (Winner of the 2005 Chechic award for outstanding security research.)  It was translated into French and Arabic.
 34 Days: Israel, Hezbollah and the War in Lebanon. with Avi Issacharoff. Hebrew edition 2006.  English Edition 2008 by Palgrave-Macmillan Books.(Winner of the 2009 Chechic award for outstanding security research.)

See also
Journalism in Israel

References

Israeli journalists
Israeli columnists
Haaretz
Living people
Tel Aviv University alumni
People from Hod HaSharon
Year of birth missing (living people)